Kerala Engineering Architecture Medical (KEAM) is an entrance examination series for admissions to various professional degree courses in the state of Kerala, India. It is conducted by the Office of the Commissioner of Entrance Exams run by the Government of Kerala.

Model of entrance test 

The model of the entrance test is published ahead of the examinations by the Commissioner of Entrance Examinations.

Engineering courses 
Students are tested on topics of Physics, Chemistry and Mathematics taught in the 11th and 12th grade of Kerala State Education Board and similar boards, and national boards such as Central Board of Secondary Education and Indian Certificate of Secondary Education. The entrance exam consists of two parts; Part I is Mathematics and Part II is Physics and Chemistry.

Medical courses 
This is similar to the Medical Entrance Tests conducted by NEET.

Architectural courses 
Architectural courses, according to the Office of the Commissioner of Entrance Examinations, Kerala, as in clause 1.4b of the prospectus, are ranked based on National Aptitude Test in Architecture (NATA), conducted by the National Institute of Advanced Studies in Architecture (NIASA) as per directives of the Council of Architecture, India.

Dissimilarity of KEAM with other entrance tests 
KEAM is probably the only entrance test series in India that is conducted by a State Government in India directly. Since 2015 all engineering colleges in the state are affiliated to KTU which is a state run technological university. In 2016, any KEAM disqualified candidates has to write KEE exam organised by private engineering colleges association to be able to apply for seats under management quota.

List of participating colleges for engineering and architectural streams (Government)

Engineering colleges under Director of Technical Education (DTE)

Government colleges

Government-aided colleges

Colleges under Kerala Agricultural University (KAU)

Colleges under Kerala Veterinary & Animal Sciences University (KVASU)

Self-financing colleges under the Institute of Human Resources Development

Self-financing colleges under the Lal Bahadur Sastri Centre for Science & Technology (LBS)

Self-financing colleges under the Co-operative Academy of Professional Education (CAPE)

Self-financing colleges under the Kerala State Road Transport Corporation

Self-financing colleges under the Mahatma Gandhi University

Self-financing colleges under the University of Kerala

Self-financing colleges under the University of Calicut

Self-financing colleges under the Center for Continuing Education

List of participating colleges for engineering and architectural streams (private)

Engineering and architectural disciplines 
The method of ranking has changed since its conception in 2006. In 2009, a new method of ranking students was proposed and put into practice in 2011 where the scores of the students in the entrance test and the scores of students in the 12th standard examinations conducted by ICSE, CBSE, Kerala State board, Other State board examinations was considered. The scores are then normalized to a set standard and then students are given a rank based on both the scores for the 12th grade examinations and common entrance examinations.
The colleges under the each universities have their choice to follow the KEAM structure in admitting students, however if a college participates in the KEAM allotment, the colleges should admit the student. KEAM Allotment occurs in the month of August. There are also 73 private colleges that participate in 2011 KEAM Engineering and Architecture Allotment.
In 2011 over 55,000 students were admitted to Engineering Colleges by KEAM. In 2011 additional 7 colleges were added to the list making 80 private colleges and 37 Government and Government Aided colleges participating in government allotment. However a majority of colleges run by Christian management conducted separate admission tests and admitted many more students. Overall over 80,000 students is expected to join in Engineering discipline in Kerala alone.

Coaching 

Govt of kerala recently started a program for KEAM coaching named as PEECS

See also
KEAM Prospectus 2016
 List of institutions of higher education in Kerala
 List of Engineering Colleges in Kerala

References

External links 
Official Website of the Commissioner for Entrance Examinations, Kerala
Official Website of the Commissioner for Entrance Examinations, Kerala ; Alternative Website

Universities and colleges in Kerala
Standardised tests in India
Organisations based in Thiruvananthapuram
Engineering entrance examinations in India
Educational institutions in India with year of establishment missing